Dennis Swilley is a former American football player who played center for the Minnesota Vikings from 1977 to 1987.
He retained the starting position regardless of the fact that the Vikings traded for future Hall of Famer Jim Langer from the Dolphins. 

Living people
American football centers
Minnesota Vikings players
Texas A&M Aggies football players
1955 births
Players of American football from Louisiana
Sportspeople from Bossier City, Louisiana